The men's 50 kilometres walk event at the 1995 Pan American Games was held in Mar del Plata on 24 March.

Results

References

Athletics at the 1995 Pan American Games
1995